Thet Tan Thit is a 2014 Burmese thriller-drama film, directed by Wyne starring  Aung Ye Lin and Phway Phway.The film, produced by Khayay Phyu Film Production premiered in Myanmar on December 5, 2014.

Cast
Aung Ye Lin as Thet Tan
Phway Phway as Thel Su Nway
Aung Lwin as Kyaung Oak Gyi
Zaw Oo as Saya
Lu Mone as Wun
Lin Let Hein as Saw Nandar
Win Myaing as Dr. Mubai
Yaza Htun Myat (child actor) as C Ko

References

2014 films
2010s Burmese-language films
Burmese thriller films
Films shot in Myanmar
Films directed by Wyne
2014 thriller films